PROS Holdings Inc. is a company that provides artificial intelligence-based software as a service platform that optimizes every shopping and selling interaction — enabling companies to deliver personalized offers to buyers with speed, precision, and consistency. Industries that PROS serves include airlines, automotive, consumer goods, distribution, energy & chemicals, food & beverage, manufacturing, medical devices & healthcare, services, technology, and transportation & logistics.

The PROS Platform gathers and analyzes data to understand buyer preferences and deliver recommendations in the form of suggested products, offers, and personalized pricing to the right sales channel. PROS is headquartered in Houston, Texas with offices in Austin, Texas; Oakland, California;  Toulouse, Biot and Paris, France; Frankfurt, Germany; Sydney, Australia; and Sofia, Bulgaria.

History
In 1985, PROS was founded by Mariette and Ron Woestemeyer. After helping pioneer revenue management in the airline industry, PROS expanded into price management and pricing optimization.

In June 2007, PROS became a public company via an initial public offering.

In December 2013, PROS acquired SignalDemand, which offers supply aware price and optimization software, for $13.5 million. 

In October 2014, PROS acquired Cameleon Software, a provider of Configure, Price, Quote (CPQ) tools, for $33 million.

In 2017, PROS acquired Vayant Travel Technologies, a privately held airfare search company based in Sofia, Bulgaria, for $35 million.

In 2019, PROS acquired French travel tech firm Travelaer SAS for $12 million.

In 2021, PROS acquired Miami-based fare-marketing company EveryMundo for $90 million.

References

Software companies based in Texas
Companies based in Houston
Companies listed on the New York Stock Exchange
Companies established in 1985
1985 establishments in Texas
Financial software companies
Software companies of the United States